Warwickshire County Council elections are held every four years. Warwickshire County Council is the upper-tier authority for the non-metropolitan county of Warwickshire in England. Since the last boundary changes in 2017, 57 councillors have been elected from 57 electoral divisions.

Political control
Warwickshire County Council was first created in 1889. Its territory, powers and responsibilities were significantly reformed under the Local Government Act 1972, with a new council elected in 1973, initially acting as a shadow authority ahead of the new arrangements coming into effect on 1 April 1974. Since 1974, political control of the council has been held by the following parties:

Leadership
The leaders of the council since 1993 have been:

Council elections
Summary of the council composition after each election; click on the year for full details of each election.

By-election results

1997–2001

2005–2009

2009–2013

2022–present

2013-2017

References

By-election results

External links
Warwickshire County Council

 
Council elections in Warwickshire
Local government in Warwickshire
County council elections in England